The 2013–14 Iowa Hawkeyes women's basketball team will represent University of Iowa during the 2013–14 NCAA Division I women's basketball season. The Hawkeyes, led by fourteenth year head coach Lisa Bluder, play their home games at the Carver-Hawkeye Arena and were a members of the Big Ten Conference. They finished with a record of 27–9 overall, 11–5 overall for a tie for a fourth-place finish. They lost in the championship game of the 2014 Big Ten Conference women's basketball tournament to Nebraska. They were invited to the 2014 NCAA Division I women's basketball tournament which they defeated Marist in the first round before getting defeated by Louisville in the second round.

Roster

Schedule

|-
!colspan=9| Exhibition

|-
!colspan=9| Regular Season

|-
!colspan=9| 2014 Big Ten Conference women's basketball tournament

|-
!colspan=9| NCAA women's tournament

Source

See also
2013–14 Iowa Hawkeyes men's basketball team

Rankings

References

Iowa Hawkeyes women's basketball seasons
Iowa
Iowa Hawkeyes women's basketball
Iowa Hawkeyes women's basketball
Iowa